The Journal of Parenteral and Enteral Nutrition is a peer-reviewed medical journal that publishes papers in the field of nutrition and dietetics. The journal was established in 1977 with Michael D. Caldwell as the founding editor. The current editor-in-chief is Kenneth B. Christopher. It is the official publication of the American Society for Parenteral and Enteral Nutrition and is published by Wiley.

Abstracting and indexing 
The journal is abstracted and indexed in:
 Biological Abstracts
 Chemical Abstracts Service
 CINAHL
 Current Contents: Clinical Medicine
 Embase
 Global Health
 MEDLINE/PubMed
 Nutrition & Food Sciences Database
 Nutrition Abstracts & Reviews Series A: Human & Experimental
 Science Citation Index Expanded
 SCOPUS
 Tropical Diseases Bulletin
 Web of Science
According to the Journal Citation Reports, the journal has a 2021 impact factor of 3.896, ranking it 51 out of 90 journals in the category ‘Nutrition & Dietetics’.

Editors                     

 Michael D. Caldwell, 1977-1980
 Harry M. Shizgal, 1981-1990
 John L. Rombeau, 1991-1999
 Danny O. Jacobs, 2000-2002
 Charles W. Van Way III, 2003-2007
 Paul E. Wischmeyer, 2007-2010
 Kelly A. Tappenden, 2010-2022
 Kenneth B. Christopher, 2022-present

References

External links 
 
 American Society for Parenteral and Enteral Nutrition

English-language journals
Nutrition and dietetics journals
Bimonthly journals
Publications established in 1977
Wiley (publisher) academic journals